Canyon de Chelly National Monument was established on April 1, 1931, as a unit of the National Park Service. Located in northeastern Arizona, it is within the boundaries of the Navajo Nation and lies in the Four Corners region. Reflecting one of the longest continuously inhabited landscapes of North America, it preserves ruins of the indigenous tribes that lived in the area, from the Ancestral Puebloans (also known as the Anasazi) to the Navajo. These canyons were cut by streams with headwaters in the Chuska Mountains just to the east of the monument. None of the land is federally owned. Canyon de Chelly is one of the most visited national monuments in the United States.

Etymology

The name Chelly (or Chelley) is a Spanish borrowing of the Navajo word , which means "canyon" (literally "inside the rock" < tsé "rock" + -yiʼ "inside of, within"). The Spanish pronunciation of de Chelly  was adapted into English, apparently modeled on  a French-like spelling pronunciation, and is now  .

History

Canyon de Chelly long served as a home for Navajo people before it was invaded by forces led by future New Mexico governor Lt. Antonio Narbona in 1805.  In 1863, Col. Kit Carson sent troops through the canyon, killing 23 Navajo, seizing 200 sheep, and destroying hogans, as well as peach orchards and other crops. The resulting demoralization led to the surrender of the Navajos and their removal to Bosque Redondo, New Mexico.

Description
Canyon de Chelly is entirely owned by the Navajo Tribal Trust of the Navajo Nation. It is the only National Park Service unit that is owned and cooperatively managed in this manner. About 40 Navajo families live in the park. Access to the canyon floor is restricted, and visitors are allowed to travel in the canyons only when accompanied by a park ranger or an authorized Navajo guide. The only exception to this rule is the White House Ruin Trail.

The park's distinctive geologic feature, Spider Rock, is a sandstone spire that rises  from the canyon floor at the junction of Canyon de Chelly and Monument Canyon.   Spider Rock can be seen from South Rim Drive.  It has served as the scene of a number of television commercials.  According to traditional Navajo beliefs, the taller of the two spires is the home of Spider Grandmother.

Most park visitors arrive by automobile and view Canyon de Chelly from the rim, following both North Rim Drive and South Rim Drive.  Ancient ruins and geologic structures are visible, but in the distance, from turnoffs on each of these routes. Deep within the park is Mummy Cave. It features structures that have been built at various times in history. Private Navajo-owned companies offer tours of the canyon floor by horseback, hiking or four-wheel drive vehicle.  The companies can be contacted directly for prices and arrangements.  No entrance fee is charged to enter the park, apart from any charges imposed by tour companies.

Accommodations for visitors are located in the vicinity of the canyon, on the road leading to Chinle, which is the nearest town.

The National Monument was listed on the National Register of Historic Places on August 25, 1970.

Climate 
The data below were compiled starting in 1908 via the WRCC.

Gallery

See also

 List of national monuments of the United States
 Ancestral Puebloans
 Battle of Canyon de Chelly
 Mesa Verde National Park
 National Register of Historic Places listings in Apache County, Arizona

References

External links

 
 
 
 
 
 
 
 
 Canyon de Chelly (poem by Simon Ortiz, 1977) Accessed 2013 January 15

1931 establishments in Arizona
Archaeological museums in Arizona
Archaeological sites on the National Register of Historic Places in Arizona
Arizona placenames of Native American origin
Cliff dwellings
Former populated places in Arizona
Geography of the Navajo Nation
Historic American Buildings Survey in Arizona
Museums in Apache County, Arizona
National Park Service National Monuments in Arizona
Native American history of Arizona
Native American museums in Arizona
Protected areas established in 1931
Protected areas of Apache County, Arizona
Former populated places in Apache County, Arizona
Canyons and gorges of Arizona
National Register of Historic Places in Apache County, Arizona
Populated places on the National Register of Historic Places in Arizona